Anisul Haque Chowdhury is a politician from the Dinajpur District of Bangladesh and an elected a member of parliament from Dinajpur-1.

Career 
Chowdhury was elected to parliament from Dinajpur-1 as an  independent candidate in 1988. He was defeated from Dinajpur-1 constituency in 1991 on the nomination of Jatiya party.

References 

Living people
Year of birth missing (living people)
People from Dinajpur District, Bangladesh
Jatiya Party politicians
4th Jatiya Sangsad members
Possibly living people